Take a Breath may refer to:
 "Take a Breath" (song), a song by David Gilmour
 Take a Breath (album), an album by Hateful Monday
 "Take a Breath", a song by the Jonas Brothers from the album Jonas Brothers